PCMH may refer to:
Patient-centered medical home
Pitt County Memorial Hospital
Pretty Cure Max Heart